Enteromius perince is a species of ray-finned fish in the genus Enteromius which has a disjunct distributed from Guinea to Uganda, and throughout length of the Nile.

Footnotes 

 

Enteromius
Fish described in 1835
Taxa named by Eduard Rüppell